This may refer to:

 Democratic Party (United States) presidential primaries, 2008
 Republican Party (United States) presidential primaries, 2008

See also:

 2008 United States presidential election